General (Rtd) Tan Sri  Abdul Hamid bin Bidin (1 July 1918 – 1995) was the 4th Chief of Defence Forces of Malaysia.

Early life
Abdul Hamid bin Bidin was born on 1 July 1918 in Kampung Pianggu, Endau Rompin, Pahang.

Military career
He began his involvement in the military on 1 August 1939 when he underwent a 6-month recruit training in Port Dickson. General Hamid became the first local to become ADC (escort) of the British High Commissioner, Sir Henry Gurney in 1950. He was also honored to command the Third Brigade in Congo in the UN Peacekeeping Force from 10 March 1961 to 28 March 1962. After that, General Hamid was promoted to Major General and held the post of Chief of Staff of the Army. He was later promoted again to Lieutenant General (7 July 1966) and finally General (1 July 1968). He was appointed Chief of Defence Forces on 25 November 1969.

Honours
 :
 Companion of the Order of the Defender of the Realm (J.M.N.) (1961)
 :
 Recipient of the Malaysian Commemorative Medal (Silver) (P.P.M.) (1965)
 Commander of the Order of Loyalty to the Crown of Malaysia (P.S.M.) – Tan Sri (1966)
 :
 Commander of the Order of the Perak State Crown (P.M.P.) (1963)
 :
 Knight Commander of the Order of the Crown of Kelantan (D.P.M.K.) – Dato’ (1964)
 Knight Grand Commander of the Order of the Crown of Kelantan (S.P.M.K.) – Dato’ (1967)
  :
 Recipient of the Meritorious Service Medal (P.J.K.) (1964)
  Knight Companion of the Order of the Crown of Pahang (DIMP) – Dato’ (1969)

References 

1918 births
1995 deaths
People from Pahang
Companions of the Order of the Defender of the Realm
Commanders of the Order of Loyalty to the Crown of Malaysia
Malaysian military personnel